Joris Abrahamsz. van der Haagen (c. 1615 – The Hague, 23 May 1669 (buried)) was a Dutch Golden Age painter specialized in landscapes.

Biography
It is unclear where Joris van der Haagen  was born, either in Arnhem or Dordrecht, but archival evidence shows that he started his drawing career in Arnhem. He probably learned to paint from his father, the painter Abraham van der Haagen. When his father died he moved in 1639 to the Hague, where he joined the Guild of St. Luke in 1643. A year later he became honorary citizen of The Hague. In 1656 he was one of the founding members of the Confrerie Pictura, which was located on the Princessegracht in the Hague. The painting he made of the Princessegracht at this time probably shows the original building, which has since been renovated beyond recognition.

Legacy
He is known for his landscapes, and especially his views of various cities in the eastern part of the Netherlands. Sometimes he collaborated with other painters, who painted figures in his landscapes. Evidence shows he worked with Dirck Wyntrack, Paulus Potter, Ludolf Leendertsz de Jongh, Jan Wijnants and Nicolaes Berchem.

According to Houbraken he used blue ash to make the color green, and this had faded by 1715, when he saw his paintings in Amsterdam. Despite this problem, the paintings were sold for high prices. He has few paintings in few British institutions the exception being Derby Art Gallery who have a landscape which is "after" him.

References

External links
Joris van der Haagen in the Rijksmuseum.
Collaboration of Dirck Wyntrack and Joris van der Haagen

1610s births
1669 deaths
Dutch Golden Age painters
Dutch male painters
People from Arnhem
Painters from The Hague
17th-century Dutch people